Nana Janelidze (born 7 August 1955) is a Georgian film director and screenwriter.

Biography
Janelidze was born on 7 August 1955 in Tbilisi. She studied at Shota Rustaveli Theatre and Film University under Tengiz Abuladze, graduating in 1981.

Janelidze worked with Tengiz Abuladze on the 1984 film Repentance as screenwriter and music designer. The film won the Grand Prix at the 1987 Cannes Film Festival, was nominated for a Golden Globe Award for Best Foreign Language Film, and won the Nika Award in six categories, including Best Screenplay.

In 1994 she wrote and directed the film Iavnana, which won her the State Prize of Georgia and Jakob Gogebashvili pedagogical prize.

In 2000 Janelidze and actress Nanuka Khuskivadze founded the film production studio N&N. In 2008-2009 Janelidze managed a project in which N&N studios collaborated with the Association for Film Heritage Protection to restore the 1912 film  Journey of Akaki Tsereteili to Racha-Lechkhumi, Georgia's first documentary film.

In 2011 Janelidze directed and co-wrote the film Will There Be a Theatre Up There?!, starring Kakhi Kavsadze, based on the true life story of the Kavsadze family. The film won a Nika Award for Best Film of the CIS and Baltic States.

In 2012 she began presenting a cinema program on Folk-Radio. From 2013 to 2016 she was director of the Georgian National Film Centre.

In 2019 a teaser was released of a biographical film on the life of Ukrainian poetess Lesya Ukrainka, directed by Janelidze, in a co-production between Georgia and Ukraine.

Filmography

Bibliography
Tengiz Abuladze – Reflections
Rezo Chkheidze – On the High Road of Film

Notes

References

1955 births
Film people from Tbilisi
Film directors from Georgia (country)
Screenwriters from Georgia (country)
Living people